Hilary Cawthorne  (born 31 December 1951) is a British fencer. She competed in the women's individual foil events at the 1976 and 1980 Summer Olympics.

In 2013, she was appointed president of British Fencing.

As Hilary Fredricke Cawthorne, she was appointed Member of the Order of the British Empire (MBE) in the 2017 New Year Honours for services to fencing.

Personal life
Her father is Derrick Cawthorne and in 1985 married British Sabre Champion Jim Philbin.

References

1951 births
Living people
British female fencers
Olympic fencers of Great Britain
Fencers at the 1976 Summer Olympics
Fencers at the 1980 Summer Olympics
People from Islington (district)
Sportspeople from London
Members of the Order of the British Empire